The 5th Element is the sixth studio album by American rapper Kellee Maize. The album was distributed by Maize's marketing company Nakturnal and revolves around the theme of love.

Production
The album was produced by Pittsburgh-based producers Nice Nate and Headphone Activist. It was mixed and mastered by producer J. Glaze.

Track listing

References

2014 albums
Kellee Maize albums